The Roman Catholic Diocese of Romblon (Lat: Dioecesis Rombloniesis) is a diocese of the Latin Church of the  Roman Catholic Church in the Philippines. The Diocese of Romblon has 24 parishes staffed by 30 priests and 1 religious SVD brother.  The diocese is divided into 6 vicariates.  It is a suffragan of the Archdiocese of Capiz.  It covers a land area of 1,355 square kilometers and has a population of 227,621 of which 87 per cent are Catholics.  Its titular patron is St. Joseph, spouse of the Blessed Virgin Mary, and its secondary patron is the Santo Niño.

Erected in 1974, the diocese has experienced no jurisdictional changes, and is a suffragan of the Archdiocese of Capiz.

Ordinaries

See also
Catholic Church in the Philippines

References

Romblon
Romblon
Christian organizations established in 1974
Roman Catholic dioceses and prelatures established in the 20th century
Religion in Romblon
1974 establishments in the Philippines